The Phi Kappa Literary Society is a college literary society, located at the University of Georgia in Athens, Georgia, and is one of the few active literary societies left in America. Founded in 1820, the society continues to meet every academic Thursday of the fall and spring semesters at 7 pm at Phi Kappa Hall on the University of Georgia's North Campus. The Phi Kappa Literary Society holds formal debates and a forum for creative writings and orations as well as poetry.

History

Formation

The society was founded by Joseph Henry Lumpkin, William Crabbe, Homer V. Howard, Stern Simmons, John G. Rutherford, and John D. Watkins. They formed the society after splitting from the Demosthenian Literary Society, dissatisfied with how the other society's meetings were being conducted. 

As Phi Kappa grew larger, makeshift meeting places were no longer appropriate or useful. Through funding provided by member Alexander Stephens, the Phi Kappa Literary Society moved into its permanent residence at Phi Kappa Hall. Phi Kappa Hall was built at a cost of $5,000 and dedicated on July 5, 1836. It is the seventh-oldest building on the University of Georgia's campus, and the Phi Kappa Literary Society currently shares use of the building with the Georgia Debate Union.

Refounding
The Phi Kappa Literary Society has disbanded and reformed many times in its history. The first occurrence was in 1863 due to student enlistment in the American Civil War, which left only five members remaining. Meetings resumed on January 5, 1866. The society flourished in the early 1900s, participating in numerous collegiate debate competitions as well as sending members to compete in international collegiate debate contests. However, a drop in student enrollment due to World War II caused the society to disband again in 1944, and an extremely polarized atmosphere in the society and the university as a whole pulled the Phi Kappa Literary Society apart, seemingly for the final time, in 1973.

After sporadic, unsuccessful attempts to revive Phi Kappa, in 1991, Stephanie Hendricks took an interest into the society after prompting from Thomas Peter Allen and was elected as its new president on January 31, 1991. Thirteen new members were inducted shortly thereafter, and the first meeting of the newly refounded society took place on February 14, 1991 in Phi Kappa Hall.

Debates and programs
In order to become a member of the Phi Kappa Literary Society, a University of Georgia student must petition the society for membership, which is a five-week process that culminates in the student delivering a petitioning speech before the society. The student must then be accepted by a vote of the society. Once a student is a full member of Phi Kappa, they must speak at least once every three weeks to maintain membership.

Weekly debates 
Each academic Thursday, Phi Kappa holds a pre-planned debate centered around a resolution in the format of "Be It Hereby Resolved." Two pre-selected speakers start off the debate with one speech in affirmation of the resolution and one in the negation. These speakers have seven minutes to deliver their speech while all subsequent speakers are limited to five minutes each. The president facilitates the debate, calling on each new speaker until the society is ready to vote. A majority vote of the society decides the winner of each debate. The society abides by Robert%27s Rules of Order for their meeting procedures.

Creative writings and orations 
The weekly main debate is followed by an open forum for creative writings and orations. In this section of the meeting, both members and guests can deliver any creative writings they may wish to share, pre-prepared speeches outside of the realms of debate, or extemporaneous speeches.

Intrasociety Debate 
Each fall, Phi Kappa holds an Intrasociety Debate between active members and alumni. Active members and alumni form teams of five and prepare a debate based on a resolution, with about a month of preparation time. The resolution is chosen in alternating years by actives or alumni. One team speaks in affirmation of the resolution, and one team speaks in negation of it. The debate is separated into three parts: constructive, rebuttal, and summation. Upon conclusion of the debate, a panel of judges (also made up of active and alumni members) select the winner.

Intersociety Debate 
Traditionally, each spring, a competitive debate is held between Phi Kappa and their rival society, Demosthenian. This long-standing debate has roots reaching back at least to the 1920s, when it was known as the "Champion Debate." In the modern era, this debate takes a similar form as the Intrasociety Debate, with a team of five debaters from each society arguing for or against an agreed upon resolution. Each team provides alternating constructive, rebuttal, and summation arguments, and the winning team is determined by evaluation from a panel of judges, who are usually university faculty members.

Phi Kappa Declamation
In the spring, Phi Kappa holds the Phi Kappa Declamation, wherein members aim to give their absolute best possible speech from a list of pre-selected topics. This is the most honored practice of the year, emphasizing impeccable rhetoric, writing, and floor presence of the speaker. 

The Declamation was first introduced in 1994, shortly after the refounding of Phi Kappa. It was previously known as the Alexander Stephens Declamation until Phi Kappa members voted to rename the event in 2019.

Campus involvement

The Phi Kappa Literary Society often collaborates with other on-campus and off-campus groups to hold special events. In 2011, members of Phi Kappa participated in a debate versus the renowned Oxford Union, and in 2013, Phi Kappa sponsored a debate between the Communist Party USA and the Libertarian Party of Georgia. The Phi Kappa Literary Society also maintains a close relationship with The Dialectic and Philanthropic Societies at UNC-Chapel Hill. Their closest tie to another student organization is their 202-year-long rivalry with the Demosthenian Literary Society. Until 2019, each spring semester Phi Kappa would debate the rival society in the Intersociety Debate. However, in November 2019 the societies revised their intersociety agreement and eliminated the Intersociety Debate. Phi Kappa instead debated Georgetown's Philodemic Society in 2021 before renegotiating the intersociety agreement with Demosthenian and reinstituting the Intersociety Debate in 2022. Besides this competetive debate, the societies continue to meet for a non-competetive Intersociety Meeting each fall.

Notable alumni
Morris B. Abram, US Ambassador to United Nations, Founder of UN Watch
Augustus O. Bacon, US Senator from Georgia, President pro tempore of the United States Senate
Francis S. Bartow, Confederate Congressman, Confederate General
Henry L. Benning, Confederate General, eponym of Fort Benning
Eugene Robert Black, Chairman of the Federal Reserve
Howell Cobb, Speaker of the US House of Representatives, US Secretary of the Treasury, President of the Confederate States Provincial Congress
Thomas Reade Rootes Cobb, Confederate General; editor of the first Georgia Code
Norman S. Fletcher, Chief Justice of the Supreme Court of Georgia
Henry W. Grady, Editor of the Atlanta Constitution; voice of the "New South" Movement
Phil Gramm, US Senator from Texas
Thomas W. Hardwick, US Senator from Georgia, Governor of Georgia, US Representative from Georgia
Nathaniel Harris, Governor of Georgia, founder of Georgia Institute of Technology
Clark Howell, Pulitzer Prize-winning editor of the Atlanta Constitution; founder of WGST 920 AM radio station
Herschel V. Johnson, Governor of Georgia, 1860 Democratic Party vice-presidential nominee
Robert Lipshutz, White House Counsel to the Jimmy Carter administration
Joseph Henry Lumpkin, First Chief Justice of the Supreme Court of Georgia, co-founder of the University of Georgia School of Law
Sam Massell, Mayor of Atlanta
Richard B. Russell Jr., US Senator from Georgia, Governor of Georgia, President pro tempore of the United States Senate
Richard B. Russell Sr., Chief Justice of the Supreme Court of Georgia, Chief Justice of the Georgia Court of Appeals
Carl Sanders, Governor of Georgia
Alexander Stephens, Vice-President of the Confederate States of America, US Representative from Georgia
Eugene Talmadge, Governor of Georgia
William Tate, Dean of Men of the University of Georgia
Ernest Vandiver, Governor of Georgia, Lt. Governor of Georgia, Georgia Adjutant General

Other historic societies

 The Demosthenian Literary Society of The University of Georgia
 The Dialectic and Philanthropic Societies of the University of North Carolina at Chapel Hill
 The Philomathean Society of the University of Pennsylvania
 The Philolexian Society of Columbia University
 The Philodemic Society of Georgetown University
 The Washington Literary Society and Debating Union and Jefferson Literary and Debating Society of the University of Virginia
 The Union-Philanthropic (Literary) Society of Hampden–Sydney College
 The American Whig–Cliosophic Society of Princeton University

References

External links
Thomas G. Dyer's The University of Georgia: A Bicentennial History 
T.W. Reed's History of the University of Georgia 
Phi Kappa Literary Society website
The Red and Black
Official UGA blog
Official SPIA blog
DiPhi website
Online Athens

1820 establishments in the United States
College literary societies in the United States
Student debating societies
University of Georgia